Otonoma sophronica is a moth in the family Cosmopterigidae. It was described by Edward Meyrick in 1920. It is found in Australia, where it has been recorded from Queensland.

References

Cosmopteriginae
Moths described in 1920